Hemophagocytic lymphohistiocytosis (HLH), also known as haemophagocytic lymphohistiocytosis (British spelling), and hemophagocytic or haemophagocytic syndrome, is an uncommon hematologic disorder seen more often in children than in adults. It is a life-threatening disease of severe hyperinflammation caused by uncontrolled proliferation of activated lymphocytes and macrophages, characterised by proliferation of morphologically benign lymphocytes and macrophages that secrete high amounts of inflammatory cytokines. It is classified as one of the cytokine storm syndromes. There are inherited and non-inherited (acquired) causes of hemophagocytic lymphohistiocytosis (HLH).

Signs and symptoms
HLH as defined by the HLH-04 criteria (see below) is a descriptive diagnosis. Its individual components are non-specific. 

The onset of HLH occurs before the age of one year in approximately 70 percent of cases. Familial HLH should be suspected if siblings are diagnosed with HLH or if symptoms recur when therapy has been stopped. Familial HLH is an autosomal recessive disease, hence each sibling of a child with familial HLH has a twenty-five–percent chance of developing the disease, a fifty-percent chance of carrying the defective gene (which is very rarely associated with any risk of disease), and a twenty-five–percent chance of not being affected and not carrying the gene defect.

Patients with HLH, especially when untreated, may need intensive therapy. Therefore, HLH should be included in the differential diagnosis of intensive care unit patients with cytopenia and hyperferritinemia. Patients in the earlier stages of HLH are frequently hospitalized at internal medicine wards.

HLH clinically manifests with fever, enlargement of the liver and spleen, enlarged lymph nodes, yellow discoloration of the skin and eyes, and a rash. Laboratory findings may include elevated triglyceride levels, low fibrinogen levels, transaminitis, and elevated ferritin levels (among others).

Causes
The vast majority of patients who meet these criteria will NOT have a genetic cause of their disease, but rather HLH will be triggered by infection, malignancy, rheumatic disease, and/or certain treatments (as in the Cytokine Release Syndrome associated with CART cell therapy). 

Primary HLH is caused by high-penetrance variants in genes associated with the syndrome, and thus is part of the phenotype of several Inborn Errors of Immunity (IEI). The most common and best studied causes of Primary HLH are loss of function, (i.e. inactivating) mutations in genes that code for proteins cytotoxic T cells and NK cells use to kill targeted cells, such as those infected with pathogens like the Epstein-Barr virus (EBV) or the Dengue virus. These mutations include those in the following genes: UNC13D, STX11, RAB27A, STXBP2, LYST, PRF1 1, SH2D1A, BIRC4, ITK, CD27, and MAGT1.

Secondary HLH (sHLH) is associated with, and thought to be promoted by, malignant and non-malignant diseases that likewise weaken the ability of the immune system to attack EBV-infected cells. Malignant disorders associated with secondary HLH include T-cell lymphoma, B-cell lymphoma, acute lymphocytic leukemia, acute myeloid leukemia, and myelodysplastic syndrome. 

In rheumatic diseases, this syndrome is more often referred to as Macrophage Activation Syndrome (MAS) and occurs most frequently in the juvenile onset and adult onset forms of Still's disease and in systemic lupus erythematosus. It occurs rarely in juvenile idiopathic arthritis, juvenile Kawasaki disease, and rheumatoid arthritis; 

Secondary HLH also occurs rarely in immunodeficiency disorders such as severe combined immunodeficiency, DiGeorge syndrome, Wiskott–Aldrich syndrome, ataxia–telangiectasia, and dyskeratosis congenita); and infections caused by EBV, cytomegalovirus, HIV/AIDS, bacteria, protozoa, fungi and SARS-CoV-2. Secondary HLH may also result from iatrogenic causes such as bone marrow or other organ transplantations; chemotherapy; or therapy with immunosuppressing agents;

About 33% of all HLH cases, ~75% of Asian HLH cases, and nearly 100% of HLH cases caused by mutations in SH2D1A (see X-linked lymphoproliferative disease type 1) are associated with, and thought triggered or promoted by, EBV infection. These cases of HLH are classified as belonging to the class of Epstein–Barr virus–associated lymphoproliferative diseases and termed EBV+ HLH.

Genetics
Five genetic subtypes (FHL1, FHL2, FHL3, FHL4, and FHL5) are described, with an estimated overall prevalence of one in 50,000 and equal gender distribution. Molecular genetic testing for four of the causative genes, PRF1 (FHL2), UNC13D (FHL3), STX11 (FHL4), and STXBP2 (FHL5), is available on a clinical basis. Symptoms of FHL are usually evident within the first few months of life and may even develop in utero. However, symptomatic presentation throughout childhood and even into young adulthood has been observed in some cases.

The five subtypes of FHL are each associated with a specific gene:
 FHL1: HPLH1
 FHL2: PRF1 (Perforin)
 FHL3: UNC13D (Munc13-4)
 FHL4: STX11  (Syntaxin 11)
 FHL5: STXBP2 (Syntaxin binding protein 2)/UNC18-2

Nearly half of the cases of type 2 familial hemophagocytic lymphohistiocytosis are due to bi-allelic PRF1 mutations.

Pathophysiology 
The underlying causes, either inherited or acquired, lead to an unchecked immune response when exposed to triggers. Impaired NK-cell cytotoxicity is the hallmark of HLH. All genetic defects for familial HLH are related to granule-dependent cytotoxicity. This inability to remove infected and antigen-presenting cells and terminate the immune response leads to uncontrolled proliferation and activation of the immune system with release of excessive cytokines. These cells then infiltrate organs, releasing more cytokines, which gives the clinical picture. The fever is caused by IL-1, IL-6 and TNF-alpha; the cytopenia is due to the suppressive effect on hematopoiesis by TNF-alpha and TNF-gamma. TNF-alpha and TNF-gamma may also lead to inhibition of lipoprotein lipase or stimulate triglyceride synthesis. Activated macrophages secrete ferritin and plasminogen activator leading to hyperfibrinolysis.

Diagnosis
The blood count typically shows decreased numbers of blood cells—including a decreased number of circulating red blood cells, white blood cells, and platelets. The bone marrow may show hemophagocytosis. The liver function tests are usually elevated. A low level of the protein albumin in the blood is common.

The serum C reactive protein, erythrocyte sedimentation rate, and ferritin level are markedly elevated. In children, a ferritin above 10000 is very sensitive and specific for the diagnosis of HLH, however, the diagnostic utility for ferritin is less for adult HLH patients.

The serum fibrinogen level is usually low and the D-dimer level is elevated.

The sphingomyelinase is elevated.

Bone marrow biopsy shows histiocytosis.

Classification
Primary HLH, also known as familial haemophagocytic lymphohistiocytosis (FHL) or familial erythrophagocytic lymphohistiocytosis, is a heterogeneous autosomal recessive disorder found to be more prevalent with parental consanguinity.

Secondary haemophagocytic lymphohistiocytosis (acquired haemophagocytic lymphohistiocytosis) occurs after strong immunologic activation, such as that which can occur with systemic infection, immunodeficiency, or underlying malignancy.

Both forms are characterized by the overwhelming activation of normal T lymphocytes and macrophages, invariably leading to clinical and haematologic alterations and death in the absence of treatment.

A subtype of primary HLH where the inflammation is limited to the central nervous system has been described.

Diagnostic criteria
The current (2008) diagnostic criteria for HLH are

1. A molecular diagnosis consistent with HLH. These include the identification of pathologic mutations of PRF1, UNC13D, or STX11.

OR

2. Fulfillment of five out of the eight criteria below:
 Fever (defined as a temperature >100.3 °F, >38 °C)
 Enlargement of the spleen
 Decreased blood cell counts affecting at least two of three lineages in the peripheral blood:
 Haemoglobin <9 g/100 ml (in infants <4 weeks: haemoglobin <10 g/100 ml) (anemia)
 Platelets <100×109/L (thrombocytopenia)
 Neutrophils <1×109/L (neutropenia)
 High blood levels of triglycerides (fasting, greater than or equal to 265 mg/100 ml) and/or decreased amounts of fibrinogen in the blood (≤ 150 mg/100 ml)
 Ferritin ≥ 500 ng/ml
 Haemophagocytosis in the bone marrow, spleen or lymph nodes
 Low or absent natural killer cell activity
 Soluble CD25 (soluble IL-2 receptor) >2400 U/ml (or per local reference laboratory)

In addition, in the case of familial HLH, no evidence of malignancy should be apparent.

Not all five out of eight criteria are required for diagnosis of HLH in adults, and a high index of suspicion is required for diagnosis as delay results in increased mortality. The diagnostic criteria were developed in pediatric populations and have not been validated for adult HLH patients.  Attempts to improve diagnosis of HLH have included use of the HScore, which can be used to estimate an individual's risk of HLH.  In adults, soluble IL-2 receptor has been found to be a very sensitive marker for HLH, demonstrating 100% sensitivity for ruling out HLH below a cutoff of 2400 U/mL and optimal cutoff for ruling in at 2515 U/mL (sensitivity, 100%; specificity, 72.5%), with 93% specificity at >10 000 U/mL.

Differential diagnosis
The differential diagnosis of HLH includes secondary HLH and macrophage-activation syndrome or other primary immunodeficiencies that present with hemophagocytic lymphohistiocytosis, such as X-linked lymphoproliferative disease.

Other conditions that may be confused with this condition include autoimmune lymphoproliferative syndrome. As a syndrome of intense inflammation it needs to be differentiated from sepsis, which may be extremely challenging.

The diagnosis of acquired, or secondary, HLH is usually made in association with infection by viruses, bacteria, fungi, or parasites or in association with lymphoma, autoimmune disease, or metabolic disease. Acquired HLH may have decreased, normal, or increased NK cell activity.

Griscelli syndrome
A major differential diagnosis of HLH is Griscelli syndrome (type 2). This is a rare autosomal recessive disorder characterized by partial albinism, hepatosplenomegaly, pancytopenia, hepatitis, immunologic abnormalities, and lymphohistiocytosis. Most cases have been diagnosed between 4 months and 7 years of age, with a mean age of about 17 months.

Three types of Griscelli syndrome are recognised: type 1 has neurologic symptoms and mutations in MYO5A. Prognosis depends on the severity of neurologic manifestations. Type 2 has mutations in RAB27A and haemophagocytic syndrome, with abnormal T-cell and macrophage activation. This type has a grave prognosis if untreated. Type 3 has mutations in melanophilin and is characterized by partial albinism. This type does not pose a threat to those so affected.

Treatment
HLH is a description of an immunophysiologic state in time. It can be dangerous to infer a genetic impairment of granule-mediated cytotoxicity in patients, especially older children and adults, who meet any of the various criteria for HLH. Thus, like shock, one must simultaneously manage both the acute physiologic changes associated with HLH (like systemic inflammation, DIC, hepatitis, etc.) and look deeply for various underlying contributors. 

The International Histiocyte Society has collected the published consensus management documents for the many contexts in which HLH occurs and they host full-text versions. 

Most patients who meet HLH criteria will have secondary cases. Treatment for these patients should focus on the underlying contributors. Additionally, treatment of the inflammation of HLH itself is often required.

While optimal treatment of HLH is still being debated, current treatment regimes usually involve high dose corticosteroids, etoposide and cyclosporin. Intravenous immunoglobulin is also used. Methotrexate and vincristine have also been used. Other medications include cytokine targeted therapy.

On 20 November 2018, the FDA approved the anti-IFN-gamma monoclonal antibody emapalumab (proprietary name Gamifant) for the treatment of pediatric and adult primary HLH.

In October 2021 NHS England published Clinical Commissioning Policy: Anakinra for Haemophagocytic Lymphohistiocytosis (HLH) for adults and children in all ages, allowing Anakinra (a modified recombinant interleukin 1 receptor antagonist) to be used in the treatment of HLH.

Prognosis
The prognosis is guarded with an overall mortality of 50%. Poor prognostic factors included HLH associated with malignancy, with half the patients dying by 1.4 months compared to 22.8 months for non-tumour associated HLH patients.

Secondary HLH in some individuals may be self-limited because patients are able to fully recover after having received only supportive medical treatment (i.e., IV immunoglobulin only). However, long-term remission without the use of cytotoxic and immune-suppressive therapies is unlikely in the majority of adults with HLH and in those with involvement of the central nervous system (brain and/or spinal cord).

History
The first case report of HLH was published in 1939 under the term HISTIOCYTIC MEDULLARY RETICULOSIS. A second report would come out in 1952 that would rename the disorder that same year.

Research 
A systematic review recently reported the pooled proportion are fever 97.2%, hepatomegaly 70.2%, splenomegaly 78.4%, thrombocytopenia 90.1%, anemia 76.0%, and serum ferritin ≥500 μg/L 97.1%. The case fatality rate is 14.6% among dengue hemophagocytic lymphohistiocytosis patients.

See also
 Emperipolesis
 X-linked lymphoproliferative disease#XLP2

References 

Autosomal recessive disorders
Diseases of immune dysregulation
Histiocytosis